Fernando Roberto Hidalgo Maldonado (born May 20, 1985 in Quito) is an Ecuadorian footballer who plays for Cumbayá as a midfielder.

Club career
Hidalgo came out of the youth system of Deportivo Quito. Before debuting for the Quito club's professional team, he played one season with Tungurahua in Ambato. He played his first season Deportivo Quito in 2006, where he became a key player for the next two seasons. In 2008, after the request of then manager Ever Hugo Almeida, he was signed by Guayaquil-based club Barcelona. However, he saw little starting time under Almeida's guidance. It wasn't until Reinaldo Merlo became the manager of Barcelona did he begin to make an impact and become a starter. He eventually captained the team and earned the nickname el Capitán. In late 2010, he returned to Quito when he signed a five-year contract with L.D.U. Quito starting in the 2011 season.

International career
Fernando also was included in Ecuador's 2010 World Cup qualifying campaign. In November 2008, he was called up to take action in a friendly against Mexico.

References

External links
Player card on FEF 

1985 births
Living people
Ecuadorian footballers
Footballers from Quito
S.D. Quito footballers
Barcelona S.C. footballers
L.D.U. Quito footballers
S.D. Aucas footballers
Ecuadorian Serie A players
Ecuadorian Serie B players
Ecuador international footballers
Association football midfielders